Eudactylinidae is a family of copepods most of which live as parasites on the gills of elasmobranch fishes; two genera lives on the gills of teleost fishes (Heterocladius and Jusheyus). The family Eudactylinidae contains the following genera:
Bariaka Cressey, 1966
Carnifossorius Deets & Ho, 1988
Dangoka Izawa, 2011
Eudactylina Van Beneden, 1853
Eudactylinella C. B. Wilson, 1932
Eudactylinodes C. B. Wilson, 1932
Eudactylinopsis Pillai, 1968
Heterocladius Deets & Ho, 1988
Janinecaira Benz, Smith, Bullard & Braswell, 2007
Jusheyus Deets & Benz, 1987
Nemesis Risso, 1826
Protodactylina Laubier, Maillard & Oliver, 1966

References

Siphonostomatoida
Crustacean families